The Gorna Dzhumaya Uprising was an anti-Ottoman rebellion that broke out and spread throughout the Pirin region of Ottoman Macedonia in 1902. 

The uprising broke out on September 23, along the middle reaches of the Struma River in modern-day Bulgaria. It was poorly organized, premature and had a small scope. The uprising was held under the leadership of the Supreme Macedonian-Adrianople Committee (SMAC). The organizers were General Ivan Tsonchev and Stoyan Mihaylovski. The Internal Macedonian-Adrianople Revolutionary Organization (IMRO) disagreed with the SMAC plan and refused to take part in the fighting. The Bulgarian government also did not support the actions of the insurgents, because it was under strong international pressure. The Uprising was suppressed and ca. 2,000 refugees escaped to Bulgaria.

With the appearance of the first refugees in many cities of the country, rallies were convened, which appealed to Europe and the Bulgarian government for intervention. The atrocities committed against the local population in the region provoked a reaction among the European public and it pressed the Sublime Porte for the adoption of some reforms. However, these reforms were not actually implemented.

See also
Ilinden-Preobrazhenie Uprising
Kresna-Razlog Uprising
Supreme Macedonian Committee chetas' action in 1895

Footnotes

Conflicts in 1902
Macedonia under the Ottoman Empire
Rebellions against the Ottoman Empire
Military history of Bulgaria
History of Blagoevgrad Province
Salonica vilayet
20th-century rebellions
Bulgarian rebellions
1902 in the Ottoman Empire
1902 in Bulgaria
Macedonian Question